Stenocarpus dumbeensis was a species of plant in the family Proteaceae. It was endemic to New Caledonia.

References

dumbeensis
Endemic flora of New Caledonia
Extinct flora of Oceania
Plant extinctions since 1500
Taxonomy articles created by Polbot